Paratraea obliquivialis is a moth in the family Crambidae. It was described by George Hampson in 1918. It is found in South Africa.

References

Crambinae
Moths described in 1918